NGC 4305 is a dwarf spiral galaxy located about 100 million light-years away in the constellation Virgo. The galaxy was discovered by astronomer John Herschel on May 2, 1829. Although considered to be a member of the Virgo Cluster, its high radial velocity and blue luminosity suggest it is in fact a background galaxy. The galaxy has a nearby major companion; NGC 4306.

NGC 4305 exhibits well-defined, smooth spiral arms which terminate well outside its central bulge. This spiral structure appears to have been induced by a tidal interaction with NGC 4306. Such a tidal interaction would also explain its deficiency in neutral hydrogen gas (HI).

References

External links

4305
040030
Virgo (constellation)
Astronomical objects discovered in 1829
Dwarf spiral galaxies
07432
Virgo Supercluster
Interacting galaxies